The 2014 Cavan Senior Football Championship was the 106th edition of Cavan GAA's premier club Gaelic football tournament for senior graded teams in County Cavan, Ireland. The tournament consists of 17 teams, with the winner going on to represent Cavan in the Ulster Senior Club Football Championship.

Ballinagh entered the championship as defending champions, but exited the championship Kingscourt Stars to at the semi-final stage.

Cavan Gaels made up for the previous year's final defeat and beat Kingscourt Stars in the final by a point. This was their 13th Senior Championship and their first since 2011.

Team Changes
The following teams have changed division since the 2013 championship season.

To Championship
Promoted from 2013 Cavan Intermediate Football Championship
  Killeshandra  -  (Intermediate Champions)

From Championship
Relegated to 2014 Cavan Intermediate Football Championship
  Belturbet

Opening rounds

Preliminary rounds

Round 1

Round 2A

Back-door stage

Round 2B

Round 3

Knock-out stage

Quarter-finals

Semi-finals

Final

Relegation play-offs

Preliminary relegation play-off

Semi-finals

Final

References

External links
 Cavan at ClubGAA
 Official Cavan GAA Website

Cavan Senior Football Championship
Cavan Senior Football Championship